Mariano Jesús Cuenco y Diosomito (January 16, 1888 – February 25, 1964) was a Filipino Cebuano politician and writer. He was the 4th President of the Senate of the Philippines.

Early life
Cuenco was born in Carmen, Cebu on January 16, 1888, to Mariano Albao Cuenco (1861–1909) and Remedios López Diosomito.  He studied at the Colegio de San Carlos of Cebu, where he graduated in 1904 with the degree of Bachelor of Arts.  He finished law in 1911 at the Escuela de Derecho (later became the Manila Law School) and passed the bar examinations in 1913.

Political career
Cuenco entered politics in 1912 when he was elected to the Philippine Assembly representing the fifth district of Cebu. He was re-elected from 1916 to 1928. He ran for the governorship of Cebu in 1931 and became the President of the League of Provincial Governors of the Philippines.  In 1934, he was elected delegate to the Constitutional Convention where he was chosen floor leader. Cuenco was Secretary of Public Works and Communications from 1936 to 1939.  He was also appointed Acting Secretary of the agriculture, commerce and labor departments while serving as Secretary of Public Works and Communications in 1938.

In 1941, Cuenco was elected Senator of the Philippines but the onset of the Second World War prevented that Senate from going into session.  After the Japanese Occupation, Cuenco was reelected to the Senate in 1946.  From 1949 to 1951, he served as Senate President and Chairman of the Commission on Appointments.  His term paved the way for many reforms and his significant contributions resulted in a more efficient legislative body.

As a member of the Liberal Party of incumbent President Elpidio Quirino, Senate President Cuenco was defeated in his bid for reelection in the Nacionalista Party shut-out during the 1951 Philippine general election.  He ran and regained his seat as a Senator once again in 1953 and 1959.  He continued serving in the Philippine Senate until his death in office in 1964.

Writer
Cuenco was also known as a prolific writer.  He was the publisher of the Spanish–language newspaper El Precursor of Cebu, a newspaper which ran from 1907 until the eve of World War II.  In 1947, he founded The Republic.  In 1926, he became a member of the Academia Filipina Correspondiente de la Real Española de la Lengua.  He was honored by the Spanish government with the decoration  Gran Cruz de Isabela la Catolica  and by the Holy See with the decoration Pro Ecclesia et Pontifice.

Cuenco also wrote in Visayan. Ang Republikang Pilipinhon, Codigo and Roma are among his works.  His pen name was "Lauro Katindog."

Personal life
He was married twice, first to Filomena Alesna, and years after she died, to Rosa Cayetano.

Cuenco died on February 25, 1964, at the age of 76. The funeral service was held in Manila North Cemetery, in Santa Cruz, Manila.

References

See also
Cuenco family
 List of Philippine legislators who died in office
 A Website Dedicated for Mariano Jesús Cuenco (And most of the Cuenco family clan during the 1900 era)
 Concepcion Cuenco Manguerra Memorial Site

1888 births
1964 deaths
Governors of Cebu
Mariano Jesus
Presidents of the Senate of the Philippines
Senators of the 5th Congress of the Philippines
Senators of the 4th Congress of the Philippines
Senators of the 3rd Congress of the Philippines
Senators of the 2nd Congress of the Philippines
Senators of the 1st Congress of the Philippines
Senators of the 1st Congress of the Commonwealth of the Philippines
Members of the House of Representatives of the Philippines from Cebu
Knights Grand Cross of the Order of Isabella the Catholic
Secretaries of Public Works and Highways of the Philippines
Secretaries of Transportation of the Philippines
Nacionalista Party politicians
Liberal Party (Philippines) politicians
University of San Carlos alumni
Burials at the Manila North Cemetery
Quezon administration cabinet members
Members of the Philippine Legislature